Aïn Lahdjar is a town and commune in Sétif Province in north-eastern Algeria. The official language is Arabic. The population was 34,338 in 2008.

References

Communes of Sétif Province